Harry Goldsmith was a New Zealand professional rugby league footballer who played in the 1910s. He played for Salford as a forward.

Playing career
Goldsmith made his début for Salford at The Willows on Saturday 14 September 1912. He was then second overseas player to appear for the club, after New Zealander Joseph Lavery in 1910.

Goldsmith played in Salford's 5-3 victory over Huddersfield in the Championship Final during the 1913–14 season, he went on to play in 95 games for Salford.

References

New Zealand rugby league players
Salford Red Devils players
Rugby league players from Napier, New Zealand
Year of birth missing
Year of death missing
New Zealand expatriate sportspeople in England